Special Jinsei Game is a board game-based video game released for the GameCube in Japan in 2003 by Takara. 

This adaptation of The Game of Life was intended for younger children. However, as a video game it was not successful and sold poorly. 

2003 video games
Digital board games
GameCube-only games
Japan-exclusive video games
GameCube games
Video games developed in Japan
Multiplayer and single-player video games